RDF 1985 is a computer wargame published in 1983 by Strategic Simulations. Developed by Roger Keating, it was the second in the "When Superpowers Collide" series.

Summary
The game simulates a battle between the American Rapid Deployment Force and Soviet forces for control of the Saudi Arabian oil fields. The player may choose to play either the American or Soviet forces, and can play in turns against another human component or against the computer.

See also
Germany 1985
Baltic 1985: Corridor to Berlin
Norway 1985

External links
 
Images of RDF 1985 box and manual from C64Sets.com

1983 video games
Alternate history video games
Apple II games
Cold War video games
Commodore 64 games
Video games set in Saudi Arabia
Multiplayer and single-player video games
Strategic Simulations games
Video games developed in Australia